Entente Melun-Fontainebleau 77 was a football club located in the towns of Melun and Fontainebleau, France. It was founded in 1987 as a result of a merger between CS Fontainebleau and US Melun, but the club split in 1988. CS Fontainebleau returned to their former name, while US Melun merged with Dammarie-lès-Lys to create Sporting Melun-Dammarie 77.

The club played only one season, during which it competed in the Division 2. The team finished in the relegation zone. In the Coupe de France, they were eliminated in the round of 64, having lost 2–1 to Division 3 club Évreux.

Notable players 

  Győző Burcsa
 Lilian Thuram

References 

Defunct football clubs in France
Association football clubs established in 1987
1987 establishments in France
Association football clubs disestablished in 1988
1988 disestablishments in France
Sport in Seine-et-Marne
Melun
Football clubs in Île-de-France